Prong or Prongs may refer to:

 Prong, synonym of tine (structural), a branch or spike of various tools and natural objects
 Prong (band), an American metal band
 Prong (company), an iPhone accessories company in New York City
 Prongs, British designation of the World War II Rhino tank
 "Prongs", nickname of James Potter (character), father of the fictional character Harry Potter

See also
 Pronghorn, an ungulate mammal native to North America
 Pronging, the gait of quadrupeds involving jumping high into the air (Stotting)
 Prong's Lighthouse, Mumbai, India